Forbidden colors may refer to:
Impossible color, a concept in color theory
Forbidden colors (Japan), the reserved colors for the robes of the highest ranking government officials in Japan
Forbidden Colours (song), 1983 song by David Sylvian and Ryuichi Sakamoto
Forbidden Colors, a 1951 LGBT-themed novel by Yukio Mishima
Forbidden Colors (dance), 1959 work by choreographer Tatsumi Hijikata
"Forbidden Colors (painting)", 1988 painting by Félix González-Torres (referring to the colors of the Palestinian flag)